This list of IIM Ahmedabad alumni includes notable alumni, professors, and administrators affiliated with Indian Institute of Management Ahmedabad. Note that this is not an exhaustive list.

Academics 
C. K. Prahalad '66, Padma Shri awardee, former Distinguished University professor at University of Michigan Ross School of Business; author of The Fortune at the Bottom of the Pyramid
Besant C. Raj '66, cofounder and Chancellor of ICFAI University, Hyderabad
Labdhi Bhandari '67 – State Trading Corporation Professor of Marketing, Indian Institute of Management, Ahmedabad
Marti G. Subrahmanyam '69 – Charles E. Merrill Professor of Finance at the Stern School of Business, New York University
Ravi Jagannathan '72 – Chicago Mercantile Exchange/John F. Sandner Professor of Finance at the Kellogg School of Management
Anil K. Gupta (scholar) '72, Michael D. Dingman Chair in Strategy, Globalization, and Entrepreneurship at University of Maryland’s Robert H. Smith School of Business
A. Parasuraman '72, Emeritus Professor of Marketing and James W. McLamore Chair Emeritus, University of Miami
Beheruz Sethna '73 – 1st President of University of West Georgia
Sri Zaheer '75 - Dean, Carlson School of Management at University of Minnesota
Sushil Vachani '76, Former Director, Indian Institute of Management Bangalore
Srikant Datar '78, Padma Shri awardee, Dean at Harvard Business School, formerly Arthur Lowes Dickinson Professor of Business Administration at Harvard Business School
Shekhar Chaudhuri FPM'79 – former Director, Indian Institute of Management Calcutta
Amitava Chattopadhyay '81, Professor of Marketing and the GlaxoSmithKline Chaired Professor of Corporate Innovation at INSEAD
Siddhartha Chib '82, Harry C. Hartkopf Professor of Econometrics and Statistics, Olin Business School, Washington University in St. Louis
S. P. Kothari '82, Padma Shri awardee, Gordon Y Billard Professor of Accounting and Finance and former Head of the Department of Economics, Finance, and Accounting at MIT Sloan School of Management
Manju Puri  '82 J. B. Fuqua Professor of Finance at the Fuqua School of Business at Duke University
Ashish Nanda '83 – former Director, Indian Institute of Management Ahmedabad, former Robert Braucher Professor of Practice at Harvard Law School, and Senior Lecturer, Harvard Business School
Raghu Sundaram '84, Dean, New York University Stern School of Business
V. Anantha Nageswaran '86, 18th Chief Economic Advisor to the Government of India
Arun Agrawal '85, Samuel Trask Dana Professor, School for Environment and Sustainability, University of Michigan
Rajeev Kakar '87, Banker and a serial business founder and entrepreneur
Baba Shiv '88, The Sanwa Bank, Limited, Professor of Marketing at Stanford University Graduate School of Business
Aseem Prakash, Professor of Political Science and Walker Family Professor for the Arts and Sciences, University of Washington
V. G. Narayanan '90 – Thomas D. Casserly, Jr. Professor of Business Administration at Harvard Business School
V. Kasturi Rangan – Malcolm P. McNair Professor of Marketing at Harvard Business School
Jagmohan Raju – Joseph J. Aresty Professor at Wharton School of the University of Pennsylvania
Harbir Singh – Mack Professor of Management at Wharton School of the University of Pennsylvania
Ajit Rangnekar – Dean, Indian School of Business
Atul Tandon – academic and director of Mudra Institute of Communications, Ahmedabad from 2001 to 2009.
Anand Teltumbde – Senior Professor and Big Data Analytics Head in Goa Institute of Management
Samir Barua FPM, Former Director, Indian Institute of Management Ahmedabad
A. K. Shiva Kumar, development economist
 Dhirajlal Keshav Desai,  Indian agricultural economist, founding faculty member at IIM-A and founded the Agriculture and Cooperatives Group

Arts and social work 
Mallika Sarabhai '74, Padma Bhushan awardee, classical dancer; activist; director of Darpana Academy, Ahmedabad
Vijay Mahajan '80 – founder and CEO of the BASIX initiative
 Salil Shetty '83 – Secretary-General of Amnesty International
Gaurav Dagaonkar '06 – music director, vocalist and songwriter
Shakti Maira – Artist, sculptor and writer
Nachiket Mor, National Director for Bill & Melinda Gates Foundation – India
Vanya Mishra- Miss world 2012 top 7
Srijan Pal Singh '09 - Author, public speaker and social entrepreneur
Mukul Chadda, Indian actor

Business 
Kiran Karnik '68 – Padma Shri awardee, former President of NASSCOM
Vikram Talwar '70, co-founder and former CEO, EXL Service Holdings Inc.
Sarthak Behuria '73 – former Chairman of Indian Oil Corporation; former chairman and managing director of Bharat Petroleum
Jerry Rao '73, founder and former CEO, Mphasis Ltd.
Chandrika Tandon '75, first Indian-American woman to be elected partner at McKinsey & Company, Grammy Award nominated artist
M. S. Banga '77, Padma Bhushan awardee, former chairman, Hindustan Unilever, currently senior partner, Clayton, Dubilier & Rice
K Raghavendra Rao '79, Padma Shri awardee, founder of Orchid Chemicals & Pharmaceuticals Limited
Shikha Sharma '80 – former MD and CEO, Axis Bank
Ajay Singh Banga '81 – President and chief executive officer, MasterCard
Ivan Menezes '81, CEO, Diageo
Piyush Gupta '83 – chief executive officer, DBS Bank
Shrikant Joshi '83 – chief executive officer and managing director of L&T Realty
Suresh Vaswani '85 – President, Dell Services
Falguni Nayar '85 – Founder and CEO, Nykaa
Amitabh Chaudhry '87, MD and CEO, Axis Bank
Archana Garodia Gupta '88, Author and Owner, Touchstone Gems and Jewellry
Sanjeev Bikhchandani '89 – Padma Shri awardee, founder and Executive vice-chairman, Infoedge and Naukri.com
Rashesh Shah '89, co-founder and CEO of Edelweiss Group
Deep Kalra '92, Founder, Chairman and Group CEO, MakeMyTrip
Sanjeev Aggarwal '95, founder and CEO, Amplus Energy Solutions
Rajesh Gopinathan '96 – CEO and MD, Tata Consultancy Services
Ashok Vemuri – CEO of Conduent
Sarathbabu Elumalai – Founder and CEO of FoodKing
Nirmal Jain, founder and chairman of India Infoline (IIFL)
K. V. Kamath, Padma Bhushan awardee, former MD & CEO, ICICI Bank, former chairman, Infosys, and 1st President of New Development Bank (BRICS)
Phaneesh Murthy – Former CEO of iGATE Corporation
Mahendra Mehta, CEO, Reliance Infrastructure and former group CEO, Vedanta Resources
Ajit Ranade, President and chief economist, Aditya Birla Group
R. Srinivasan, founder and former MD, Redington India
Vijay K. Rekhi - Former President and MD, United Spirits Limited
Anushka Chauhan - President and MD, Delta Airlines

Government and politics 
Kirit Raval '73 – former Solicitor General of India
 Prem Das Rai '78 – Member of Parliament, Sikkim constituency, 15th Lok Sabha
Arvind Subramanian '81 – 16th Chief Economic Adviser to the Government of India
Jawed Ashraf '86, Ambassador of India to France, former High Commissioner of India to Singapore
 Raghuram Rajan '87 – former Governor of the Reserve Bank of India; former chief economic advisor of the Government of India and former chief economist at the International Monetary Fund. Currently Katherine Dusak Miller Distinguished Service Professor of Finance at University of Chicago Booth School of Business
 Saurabh Garg '88, CEO, Unique Identification Authority of India (UIDAI), IAS Officer
 Prodyut Bora '99, first chief of IT Cell and National Executive Committee member of the Bharatiya Janata Party
Ramachandran Govindarasu '15, Tamil Nadu politician affiliated with AIADMK
Amit Khare – Additional Chief Secretary of Jharkhand.
Srijan Pal Singh, Former Adviser to Dr A. P. J. Abdul Kalam
Alok Ranjan, Former Chief Secretary of Uttar Pradesh.
Jawed Usmani – Chief Information Commissioner of Uttar Pradesh.
 Syed Zafar Islam, Investment Banker and Member of Parliament in the Rajya Sabha, former Director at Deutsche Bank and Spokesperson of Bharatiya Janata Party
 R. R. Bhatnagar, former Director General of the Central Reserve Police Force, retired IPS officer

Sports 
Harsha Bhogle '85 – cricket commentator and journalist

Science 
Suchitra Sebastian '97, condensed matter physicist at Cavendish Laboratory, University of Cambridge

Literature and journalism 
Rohini Chowdhury '86, children's writer and literary translator
Rashmi Bansal '93, author and entrepreneur
Chetan Bhagat '97, author, columnist and speaker
Sidin Vadukut '05, author and former Managing Editor, Mint
Rahul Roushan '07, founder of Faking News and Chief Strategy Officer of Swarajya magazine
Srijan Pal Singh, former adviser to A. P. J. Abdul Kalam and Founder of Dr. Kalam Centre
Samit Basu, novelist, graphic novelist and screenwriter.

Faculty 
 I. G. Patel, former Director and 14th Governor of the Reserve Bank of India
 C. Rangarajan, former Member of Parliament and 19th Governor of the Reserve Bank of India
 Y. Venugopal Reddy, 21st Governor of the Reserve Bank of India
 C. K. Prahalad, famous management thinker, exponent of Core competency and Fortune at the Bottom of the Pyramid
 Ravi J. Matthai, first full-time Director, management educationist noted for establishing Institute of Rural Management Anand
 Bakul Harshadrai Dholakia, Padma Shri awardee, Director (2002–2007)
 Samuel Paul, Padma Shri awardee, IIMA's second director (1972–78)
 Vijay Govindarajan, a New York Times & Wall Street Journal best-selling author, Thinkers50 Hall of Fame 2019 & Coxe Distinguished Professor, Tuck School of Business
 Anil Kumar Gupta was a professor who was awarded Padma Shri for his contributions to management education.
 Pankaj Chandra, former Director, Indian Institute of Management Bangalore and current Vice Chancellor, Ahmedabad University
 Shekhar Chaudhuri, former Director, Indian Institute of Management Calcutta
 Abhishek Mishra was a faculty member for six years, before leaving to become a member of Samajwadi Party and an elected MLA of Uttar Pradesh.
 Dheeraj Sharma, director, Indian Institute of Management Rohtak
 Jahar Saha, Institute Director 1998–2002
 Rajnish Rai, former DGP, Indian Police; served as Assistant Professor
 Marti G. Subrahmanyam, best known for his research in the areas of corporate finance, capital markets and international finance.
 Ashish Nanda, Institute Director from 2013 to 2017
 T. V. Rao, Indian Human Resources Development professional
 Rakesh Basant, JSW Chair Professor of Innovation and Public Policy
 N. Ravichandran (professor), 4th full-time director of The Indian Institute of Management Indore
 Samir Barua, 10th Institute Director
 Labdhi Bhandari, State Trading Corporation of India Professor of Marketing
 Kamla Chowdhry, key founding member of the institute and first faculty member
 Frank Land, information systems researcher and was the first United Kingdom Professor of Information Systems
 Akhileshwar Pathak, professor of business law
 Samuel Paul, second director of the institute
 Jerry Rao, founder and former CEO of the software company MphasiS
 Ashok Som
 Dwijendra Tripathi, professor of business history for over 25 years. He is considered the "Father of Business History" in India.
 Harsh Mander, retired IAS officer and former member, National Advisory Council (India), Govt. of India

Administration 

 N. R. Narayana Murthy, Indian IT industrialist and the co-founder of Infosys, got his first job as chief systems programmer at IIM Ahmedabad.

References

External links 
 

 
Indian Institutes of Management alumni
People
Indian Institute of Management Ahmedabad
Indian Institute of Management Ahmedabad